Jakub Janso (born 27 December 1989 in Myjava) is a Slovak football defender who last played for the Corgoň Liga club MFK Ružomberok.

MFK Ružomberok
He made his professional debut for the MFK Ružomberok senior side on 1 December 2012 in the Corgoň Liga match against Slovan Bratislava, in the 2-2 home draw.

References

External links
MFK Ružomberok profile

1989 births
Living people
Slovak footballers
Association football defenders
MFK Ružomberok players
Slovak Super Liga players
People from Myjava
Sportspeople from the Trenčín Region